"Saule, Pērkons, Daugava" is a Latvian choir song. The text originates from the 1916 poem Daugava by the Latvian poet Rainis, while the musical part is composed by Mārtiņš Brauns.

The song was first performed in the Valmiera Drama Theatre in 1988. In 1990 it was performed at the Latvian Song and Dance Festival and quickly became a musical symbol of the Singing Revolution. After Latvia regained its independence, the song remained highly popular and there was even a discussion of it becoming the new national anthem.

In 2014, an adapted version of the song with lyrics of Miquel Martí i Pol, titled  became the official anthem of the Catalan independence movement.

In 2018, it was voted the best Latvian song by listeners of the Radio SWH radio station, winning a plurality of the nearly 137,000 votes cast.

Lyrics

References 

National symbols of Latvia
Latvian folk songs